Marcos Morales Torres (born 26 November 1944) is a Mexican politician affiliated with the Party of the Democratic Revolution. He served as Deputy of the LIX Legislature of the Mexican Congress representing the Federal District, and previously served in the Legislative Assembly of the Federal District.

References

1944 births
Living people
Politicians from Mexico City
Party of the Democratic Revolution politicians
Members of the Congress of Mexico City
21st-century Mexican politicians
Instituto Politécnico Nacional alumni
Deputies of the LIX Legislature of Mexico
Members of the Chamber of Deputies (Mexico) for Mexico City